Hämmerli, also Haemmerli and Hammerli is a German surname."Haemmerle"

People 

 Bernhard M. Hämmerli (born 1958), Swiss computer scientist
 Marco Hämmerli (born 1985), Swiss football defender

Company 

 Hämmerli, a Swiss manufacturer of firearms

See also 

 Hammerl

German-language surnames